Soyuz T-9 (Russian: Союз Т-9, Union T-9) was the 4th expedition to Salyut 7 following the failed docking of Soyuz T-8. It returned lab experiments to Earth. The next mission, Soyuz 7K-ST No.16L (Soyuz 10a), had exploded and thus failed to launch.

Soyuz T-9 achieved successful docking with the station, although the mission was bracketed by the failed attempt of Soyuz T-8 and the launch pad abort of Soyuz T-10 which would follow immediately.

Crew

Backup crew

Mission parameters 
 Mass: 6850 kg
 Perigee: 201 km
 Apogee: 229 km
 Inclination: 51.6°
 Period: 88.6 minutes

Mission highlights 
Fourth expedition to Salyut 7. Its mission was heavily impacted by the Soyuz T-8 docking failure and the Soyuz T-10a Soyuz booster failures which bracketed it.

Almost immediately after docking at Salyut 7's aft port, the crew entered Kosmos 1443 and commenced transferring the 3.5 tons of cargo lining its walls to Salyut 7.

On 27 July 1983, a small object struck a Salyut 7 viewport. It blasted out a 4-mm crater, but did not penetrate the outer of the window's two panes. The Soviets believed it was a member of the Delta Aquariid meteor shower, though it may have been a small piece of orbital debris.

The crew loaded Cosmos 1443's VA capsule with 350 kg of experiment results and hardware no longer in use. It could have held 500 kg, had they had that much to put in. Cosmos 1443 then undocked, in spite of Western predictions that the FGB component would remain attached to Salyut 7 as a space station module. The VA capsule soft-landed on 23 August 1983, and the FGB component continued in orbit until it was deorbited over the Pacific Ocean on 19 September 1983.

The crew also filmed scenes for the movie Return from Orbit.

See also 

 List of human spaceflights to Salyut space stations
 List of Salyut expeditions

References

Crewed Soyuz missions
1983 in spaceflight
1983 in the Soviet Union
Spacecraft launched in 1983